Linda Grant DePauw (born January 19, 1940) is an American modern historian, retired university teacher, non-fiction author and journal editor, who is a pioneer in women's research in the United States. She received the Beveridge Award in 1964, was shortlisted for the American Book Awards in 1983, and became part of a book published by the National Women's Hall of Fame in 1998.

Early life 
Linda Grant was born in New York City, in 1940. She is the daughter of Phillip Grant and Ruth (Marks) Grant. She received her bachelor's degree in history education at Swarthmore College in 1961. In 1964, she graduated from Johns Hopkins University with a Ph.D.

Career 
After marriage, her surname became "Grant DePauw".

In 1964/65, Grant DePauw worked as Assistant Professor at the Department of History at George Mason University. In 1964, she received the Albert J. Beveridge Award for her doctoral thesis "The Eleventh Pillar: New York State and the Federal Constitution".

In 1965–66, she worked as technical assistant at the National Archives and Records Administration (NARA) and, from 1966 to 1969, an assistant history professor at George Washington University (GWU). In 1969–1975, she taught there as an associate professor and from 1975 until her retirement in 1999 as a full professor of American history. She is now Professor Emeritus of History at GWU.

Grant DePauw was a pioneer in women's studies research in the United States, describing the role of women in the American Revolution and the American Civil War. In 2007, she wrote the book about the war effort of Molly Pitcher at the Battle of Monmouth (1778). In 1983, she founded in New York, "The Minerva Center" (an institution for the study of women in the military), serving as its long-time president and editing the Minerva Journal of Women and War. She is a longtime member of the American Historical Association (AHA).

Awards and honors 
 1964, Beveridge Award
 1983, shortlisted, The American Book Awards
 1998, National Women's Hall of Fame

Works 
 The Eleventh Pillar. New York State and the Federal Constitution. (doctoral dissertation), 1964
 Four traditions. Women of New York during the American Revolution. 1974
 Founding Mothers. Women of America in the Revolutionary Era. Erstausgabe 1975
 mit Conover Hunt, Miriam Schneidr: Remember the Ladies. Women in America 1750–1815.  Erstausgabe 1975 
 Fortunes of War. New Jersey Women and the American Revolution. (New Jersey's Revolutionary Experience). vol. 26 (1978)
 Seafaring Women. 1982
 Baptism of Fire. Minerva Center 1993
 Battle Cries and Lullabies. Women in War from Prehistory to the Present. Norman. University of Oklahoma Press 1998
 Sea Changes. 2003
 In Search of Molly Pitcher. 2007

References

External links 
 Präsenz Linda Grant DePauw

1940 births
Living people
20th-century American historians
21st-century American historians
20th-century American non-fiction writers
20th-century American women writers
21st-century American women writers
Swarthmore College alumni
Johns Hopkins University alumni
George Mason University faculty
George Washington University faculty
American Historical Association
Women's studies academics
Academic journal editors
21st-century American biographers
American women biographers